Route 40, also known as  Portugal Cove Road, is a  north-south highway on the Avalon Peninsula of Newfoundland, extending from St. John's to the town of Portugal Cove-St. Philips in Newfoundland and Labrador, Canada.

Route 40 also serves as the primary access to St. John's International Airport and the Bell Island Ferry terminal.

Route description

Route 40 begins as a two-lane street just north of downtown St. John's at an intersection with Rennies Mill Road. It heads northwest to cross over a brook and pass by neighbourhoods and several parks. The highway passes through a business district at an intersection with Elizabeth Avenue before passing through more neighbourhoods and having a Y-Intersection with New Cove Road. Route 40 now widens to a 4-lane highway as it passes through a business district and has an intersection with The Parkway (Prince Philip Drive/MacDonald Drive). It continues northwest to have a large interchange with Route 1 (Trans Canada Highway, exits 47 A/B) before passing by St. John's International Airport. The highway now narrows to 2-lanes to leave St. John's and pass through rural areas to enter Portugal Cove-St. Phillips. Route 40 winds its west through the town for several kilometres before coming to an intersection with Route 41 (Beachy Cove Road), where Route 40 turns north on Ferry Terminal Road for a short distance before coming to an end at the Bell Island Ferry terminal.

Major intersections

See also 

List of Newfoundland and Labrador highways
List of highways numbered 40

References 

040
Streets in St. John's, Newfoundland and Labrador